Euphorbia boetica is a species of flowering plant in the spurge family Euphorbiaceae. It is endemic to the Iberian Peninsula.

References

External links

boetica
Plants described in 1860
Flora of Portugal
Flora of Spain
Flora of Gibraltar